In lattice theory, a bounded lattice L is called a 0,1-simple lattice if nonconstant lattice homomorphisms of L preserve the identity of its top and bottom elements. That is, if L is 0,1-simple and ƒ is a function from L to some other lattice that preserves joins and meets and does not map every element of L to a single element of the image, then it must be the case that ƒ−1(ƒ(0)) = {0} and ƒ−1(ƒ(1)) = {1}.

For instance, let Ln be a lattice with n atoms a1, a2, ..., an, top and bottom elements 1 and 0, and no other elements. Then for n ≥ 3, Ln is 0,1-simple. However, for n = 2, the function ƒ that maps 0 and a1 to 0 and that maps a2 and 1 to 1 is a homomorphism, showing that  L2 is not 0,1-simple.

External links

Lattice theory